Shana Amanda Cox (born January 22, 1985) is an American-born track and field athlete, who competes internationally for Great Britain since 2011. She specialises in the 200 metres and 400 metres.

Cox was born in Brooklyn, New York to parents of British descent. Growing up in Long Island, New York, she attended Trinity Lutheran School in Hicksville, New York, as well as the Holy Trinity Diocesan High School and Penn State. In her senior year at college, she won the 400 metres and 4 × 400 metres relay at the 2008 NCAA Women's Outdoor Track and Field Championship.

In 2011, the International Association of Athletics Federations approved Cox's transfer of allegiance from the US to Great Britain, the birthplace of both her parents.

Competing in her first major competition for Great Britain, Cox won a gold medal in the women's 4 × 400 metres relay at the 2012 IAAF World Indoor Championships in Istanbul, Turkey, as part of a team that also included Nicola Sanders, Christine Ohuruogu and Perri Shakes-Drayton.

On November 9, 2013, she married Michael Bingham, also an American-born sprinter representing Great Britain.

Achievements

Personal bests

See also
List of Pennsylvania State University Olympians

References

 

1985 births
Living people
British female sprinters
English female sprinters
American female sprinters
Olympic athletes of Great Britain
Athletes (track and field) at the 2012 Summer Olympics
Commonwealth Games medallists in athletics
Commonwealth Games bronze medallists for England
Athletes (track and field) at the 2014 Commonwealth Games
World Athletics Championships medalists
European Athletics Championships medalists
Sportspeople from Brooklyn
People from Hicksville, New York
World Athletics Indoor Championships winners
World Athletics Indoor Championships medalists
Track and field athletes from New York City
Olympic female sprinters
21st-century American women
Medallists at the 2014 Commonwealth Games